Jacques Marie Charles Nivière (28 October 1873 – 24 April 1958) was a French sports shooter. He competed in the men's trap event at the 1900 Summer Olympics.

References

External links
 

1873 births
1958 deaths
French male sport shooters
Olympic shooters of France
Shooters at the 1900 Summer Olympics
Sport shooters from Paris